Wellington da Silva Vicente (born April 30, 1983), known as Vicente, is a Brazilian footballer, born in Maceió, Alagoas, who plays left back.

Contract
 Ceará.

References

External links
ogol.com.br

1983 births
Brazilian footballers
Living people
Campeonato Brasileiro Série A players
Campeonato Brasileiro Série B players
Campeonato Brasileiro Série C players
Campeonato Brasileiro Série D players
Iraty Sport Club players
Marília Atlético Clube players
Associação Atlética Ponte Preta players
Coritiba Foot Ball Club players
Clube Náutico Capibaribe players
Ceará Sporting Club players
Associação Desportiva São Caetano players
São Bernardo Futebol Clube players
Capivariano Futebol Clube players
Club Sportivo Sergipe players
Botafogo Futebol Clube (SP) players
Alagoinhas Atlético Clube players
Fluminense de Feira Futebol Clube players
Association football fullbacks
Sportspeople from Alagoas